Heartbreak High is an Australian comedy drama streaming television series created for Netflix, by Hannah Carroll Chapman. It is a soft-reboot of the 1994 series first screened on Network Ten. The series follow the students and teachers of Hartley High as they navigate racial tensions in Australia, high school romances, and all sorts of teen angst. The show premiered on 14 September 2022. A month after it was released, the show was renewed for a second season. 

The first season was met with positive critical reviews and received 15 AACTA Awards nominations, including Best Drama Series, winning six.

Premise
After a map detailing the sexual exploits of Hartley High's students is discovered graffitied on the wall of the school, all of the students whose names were on it are forced to attend a new sexual education course called the Sexual Literacy Tutorial (SLT, pronounced "sluts" by the students). The map's creator, Amerie Wadia (Ayesha Madon), becomes a social outcast after taking the fall for its co-author, Harper McLean (Asher Yasbincek), who has stopped talking to her following a tragedy at a music festival they attended.

Cast

Main
 Ayesha Madon as Amerie Wadia, a brash, working-class Indo-Australian girl who becomes a pariah at Hartley High.
 James Majoos as Darren Rivers, a queer and non-binary student who befriends Amerie. 
 Chloé Hayden as Quinn “Quinni” Gallagher-Jones, Darren's lesbian best friend who is autistic.
 Asher Yasbincek as Harper McLean, a punk girl who has had a falling out with Amerie
 Thomas Weatherall as Malakai Mitchell, a bisexual Bundjalung basketball jock new to Hartley.
 Will McDonald as Douglas “Ca$h” Piggott, an asexual eshay, drug dealer and food delivery driver.
 Joshua Heuston as Dustin “Dusty” Reid, a bisexual musician involved with Harper.
 Gemma Chua-Tran as Sasha So, a Chinese-Australian lesbian. 
 Bryn Chapman-Parish as Spencer “Spider” White, the class clown. 
 Sherry-Lee Watson as Missy Beckett, an Indigenous student involved with Sasha. 
 Brodie Townsend as Anthony “Ant” Vaughn, an affable, big-hearted student. 
 Chika Ikogwe as Josephine “Jojo” Obah, English and SLT’s teacher at Hartley High. 
 Scott Major as Peter Rivers, Darren's father, who reprises his role from the 1994 series.
 Rachel House as Principal Stacy "Woodsy" Woods, the performatively woke school principal at Hartley High.

Recurring and notable guest stars
 Isabella Mistry as Chaka Cardenes, who reprises her role as a Salvadoran-Australian from the 1994 series. 
 Ben Oxenbould as Justin McLean, Harper's dad. 
 Justin Smith as Jim the Maintenance Man. 
 Sandy Sharma as Huma Wadia, Amerie's mother. 
 Tom Wilson, Kye McMaster and Ari McCarthy as Chook, Tilla and Jayden, Ca$h's friends. 
 Maggie Dence as Nan, Ca$h's grandmother. 
 Stephen Hunter as Coach Arkell. 
 Jeremy Lindsay Taylor as Kurt Peterson, who reprises his role from the 1994 series. 
 Natalie Tran as Rhea Brown, a local author.

Episodes

Production 
The series was announced in December 2020, and filming began in November 2021.

The TV series was mostly filmed in the suburbs of Marouba and Matraville of New South Wales between late 2021 and early 2022.

A second season was announced on 19 October 2022.

Reception

Audience viewership 
Heartbreak High debuted at number six on Netflix's Top 10 TV English titles for the tracking week of 19–25 September 2022 with 18.25 million hours viewed. On the following week, it climbed to number five and garnered 14.88 million viewing hours. The series remained in the top 10 for the third week, placing at number eight with 9.48 million viewing hours.

Critical response 
The review aggregator website Rotten Tomatoes gave the series an approval rating of 100%, with an average rating of 7.3 out of 10, based on nine critics. On the review website IMDb, the series holds an average score of 7.7 out of 10, as of October 15, 2022. The show received praise for its racial, sexuality, gender and neurodivergent representation, realism towards modern teenhood, costumes and visuals. It was also positively compared to other popular modern teen dramas (which viewers found it very similar to), including Euphoria, Never Have I Ever and Sex Education. Alex Henderson of The Conversation said that the show addressed serious topics like substance abuse, discrimination or youth crime, but still uses comical moments and avoids cliché moments whilst showing mistakes made by the characters. Mitchell Adams of The Sydney Morning Herald commented on the representation of autism, saying "scenes where Quinni feels overwhelmed just sitting on a bus, or being at a party while forcing herself to mask how she feels in order to better fit in and not upset people, depict a pain neurodivergent people know all too well". Collider named the series as one of the best new TV shows of 2022.

Accolades

References

External links 
 
 

2022 Australian television series debuts
2020s Australian drama television series
2020s Australian comedy television series
2020s LGBT-related drama television series
2020s LGBT-related comedy television series
2020s teen drama television series
Australian comedy-drama television series
Australian high school television series
Australian LGBT-related television shows 
Autism in television
Lesbian-related television shows
Television series about teenagers
Television series by Fremantle (company)
Television series reboots
English-language Netflix original programming